Eupithecia insolabilis is a moth in the family Geometridae first described by George Duryea Hulst in 1900. It is found in the southern United States, including Utah, Arizona and New Mexico.

The wingspan is about 21 mm. The forewings are light brownish gray, finely sprinkled with whitish. The hindwings are somewhat paler than the forewings. Adults have been recorded on wing from June to August.

References

Moths described in 1900
insolabilis
Moths of North America